Iluppur is a panchayat town in Pudukkottai district in the Indian state of Tamil Nadu.

Geography
It has an average elevation of 142 metres (465 feet).

Demographics
 India census, Iluppur had a population of 12,051. Males constitute 50% of the population and females 50%. Iluppur has an average literacy rate of 70%, higher than the national average of 59.5%: male literacy is 78%, and female literacy is 63%. In Iluppur, 17% of the population is under 6 years of age.

References

Cities and towns in Pudukkottai district
Palayam